Lubenia  is a village in Rzeszów County, Subcarpathian Voivodeship, in south-eastern Poland. It is the seat of the gmina (administrative district) called Gmina Lubenia.

The village has a population of 2,400.

References

Lubenia